Senator Lincoln may refer to:

Alanson T. Lincoln (1858–1925), Virginia State Senate
Blanche Lincoln (born 1960), U.S. Senator from Arkansas from 1999 to 2011
Georgianna Lincoln (born 1943), Alaska State Senate
J. William Lincoln (born 1940), Pennsylvania State Senate
Levi Lincoln Jr. (1782–1868), Massachusetts State Senate
Levi Lincoln Sr. (1749–1820), Massachusetts State Senate
Wyman Lincoln (1828–1894), Wisconsin State Senate